Sing It! is an American situation comedy streaming television series created by Benny Fine and Rafi Fine. It is executive produced by Benny Fine, Rafi Fine, Max Benator, Todd Lieberman, David Hoberman, Laurie Zaks, Barry Safchik, and Michael Platt, and produced by Mandeville Films, Potvin Sucks Productions, and Fine Brothers Entertainment. The pilot had a premiere on April 21, 2016, during the Tribeca Film Festival. The show debuted on May 25, 2016 on YouTube Red, a paid service of streaming original series and movies, similar to Netflix. It stars Mircea Monroe, Mark Sullivan, Debby Ryan, Preston Jones, Alex Désert, Todrick Hall, Missi Pyle and Ace Young. On December 3, 2017, creator Benny Fine confirmed that the series would not return for a second season.

Premise

Stacey Needles (Mircea Monroe) is the underrated production assistant from Sing It!, a television music competition series. When the original executive producer was fired, she sees an opportunity to fill the position and be valued for their work. But her plan to take charge is thwarted with the arrival of newcomer indie production assistant, Drew (Mark Jude Sullivan). He is inexperienced, but creative and excited, stealing the attention of executives, becoming the potential future executive producer, which makes Needles try to overcome every day.

The program includes the sexy and charismatic presenter Troy Blue (Preston Jones) and the judges Holli Holiday (Debby Ryan), a famous and egocentric singer, who uses the program to self-promote, and Barry (Alex Désert), an artist manager and television producer, who is rarely impressed by a contestant. During the program, ten contestants was selected at the auditions to compete, where each week one of them was eliminated.

Cast and characters

Main
 Mircea Monroe as Stacey Needles, a production assistant, who wants to be executive producer.
 Mark Jude Sullivan as Drew, the new production assistant, who becomes a potential future executive producer.
 Debby Ryan as Holli Holiday, one of the judges. A famous and egocentric singer, who uses the program to self-promote.
 Preston Jones as Troy Blue, the seductive and charismatic presenter of Sing It!.
 Alex Désert as Barry, one of the judges. An artist manager and television producer, who is rarely impressed by a contestant.
 Missi Pyle as Marcy
 Laura Harrison as Kali, Stacey's assistant
 Zack Weinstein as Luke, Drew's assistant

Recurring
 Ace Young as Darrell Docket, a contestant and Darcy's husband.
 Diana DeGarmo as Darcy Docket, a country contestant and Darrell's wife.
 Leah Lewis as Sophie Chu, a contestant
 Diamond White as Maisy Kelly, a contestant.
 J.D. Phillips as Freddy Traymont, a contestant
 Lily Mae Harrington as Adeline Murphy, a contestant
 Drew James as Zack Tribbet, a contestant
 Maxwell Glick as Shimon Rabinowitz, a contestant
 Shoniqua Shandai as Crystal Carl, a contestant
 Sam Tsui as Magnus Erikson, a contestant
 Scott Rodgers as a Technical Director
 Karl T. Wright as Jon Kelly, Maisy's father
 Janna Cardia as Catherine Kelly, Maisy's mother

Guest
 Sasha Pieterse as Destiny Wood, Holli's old friend
 Todrick Hall as Milo, a record producer
 Yanic Truesdale as Beau Hemsworth, the president of the network

Episodes

Production
In October 2015, Fine Brothers announced a partnership with YouTube Red, a new paid service of streaming original series and movies, similar to Netflix. They started to work on a new comedy series, satirizing the talent shows. The show was inspired by television music competitions The X Factor, The Voice and American Idol. In November, Debby Ryan, Preston Jones, Alex Désert and Todrick Hall were confirmed in the cast. In a partnership with the production company Mandeville Films, the series began to be recorded in December. The character Holli Holiday, played by Debby Ryan, was inspired by Paula Abdul and Randy, played by Alex Désert, inspired by Simon Cowell. A teaser was released on April 13, 2016.

Reception
Sing It! has received generally negative reviews. Many have criticised the bad character design, poor writing and characters, slow pacing and often forgettable episodes. Emily Ashby of Common Sense Media gave Sing It! 3 out of 5 stars.

References

External links
 
 

2016 web series debuts
YouTube Premium original series
American comedy web series
2010s American sitcoms
2016 American television series debuts
2016 American television series endings